HMS Solebay was a  sixth-rate frigate of the Royal Navy which saw active service between 1766 and 1782, during the latter part of the Seven Years' War and throughout the American Revolutionary War. After a successful career in which she captured seven enemy vessels, she was wrecked ashore on the Caribbean Island of Nevis.

Construction

Solebay was one of three Royal Navy vessels designed according to a 1760 schematic drawn up by Sir Thomas Slade, a naval architect and newly appointed Surveyor of the Navy. Slade had been impressed with the sailing qualities of a captured French vessel, Abénaquise, and used this vessel as his template for Solebay with modifications to incorporate a heavier hull and better sailing qualities in poor weather. His plans for the new 28-gun sixth-rate were approved by Admiralty on 30 January 1762. At the time, the Royal Dockyards were fully engaged in maintaining and fitting-out the Navy's ships of the line. Consequently, the contracts for Solebay were issued to a private shipyard, Thomas Airey and Company of Newcastle-upon-Tyne, with a requirement that the vessel be completed within 14 months at a cost of £9.3s per ton burthen.

Solebays keel was laid down on 10 May 1762 and work proceeded swiftly with the vessel ready to be launched by 9 September 1763, just outside Admiralty's stipulated construction time. She measured 619 tons burthen. Construction and fit-out cost £9,979.7s, including provision of 24 nine-pounder cannons located along her gun deck, supported by four three-pounder cannons on the quarterdeck and twelve -pounder swivel guns ranged along her sides.

She was named on 30 April 1763 after Sole Bay in Southwold in Suffolk. In selecting her name the Board of Admiralty continued a tradition dating to 1644, of using prominent geographic features; Sole Bay having been the site of a naval engagement between the English and the Dutch in 1672. 17. Her designated complement was 200, comprising two commissioned officers  a captain and a lieutenant  overseeing 40 warrant and petty officers, 91 naval ratings, 38 Marines and 29 servants and other ranks. Among these other ranks were four positions reserved for widow's men  fictitious crew members whose pay was intended to be reallocated to the families of sailors who died at sea.

Career
Solebay commissioned in August 1763 under Captain William Hay. In 1777-78 the vessel was used as a floating prison for John McKinly, the first President of Delaware, who was captured by the British Army after the Battle of Brandywine.

On 9 December 1780 Solebay and  captured two French privateers behind the Isle of Wight after a short action. The two were Comptesse of Buzanisis, Lux, master, and Marques de Seiguley. Each had a crew of 150 men. Comptesse was armed with twenty 12-pounder guns and Marques was armed with twenty 9-pounder guns. In the action Solebay had one man wounded, and Portland had nine, two of whom died later. Comptesse of Buzanisis was believed to have been the English privateer .

Notes

References

Bibliography

Further reading
 Robert Gardiner, The First Frigates, Conway Maritime Press, London 1992. .

1763 ships
Sixth-rate frigates of the Royal Navy
Ships built on the River Tyne
Maritime incidents in 1782